Indiana Hi-Rail Corporation  was a railroad which operated lines in the U.S. states of Indiana, Illinois and Ohio. It ceased operations after it was declared bankrupt in 1997.  The railroad was known for its extensive use of locomotives built by the American Locomotive Company (ALCO).

References

External links
 | American Rails article on Indiana Hi-Rail Corporation

Defunct Ohio railroads
Defunct Indiana railroads
Defunct Illinois railroads
Defunct Kentucky railroads